= Mahawadiya =

- village
- Location within Madhya Pradesh Location within India
- Coordinates: 23.117020°N 77.395292°E
- Country: India
- State: Madhya Pradesh
- District: Bhopal
- Tehsil: Huzur

Population (2011)
  - Total: 1,194
- Time zone: UTC+5:30 (IST)
- ISO 3166 code: MP-IN
- Census code: 482527

Mahawadiya is a village in the Bhopal district of Madhya Pradesh, India. It is located in the Huzur tehsil and the Phanda block.

== Demographics ==
According to the 2011 census of India, Mahawadiya has 247 households. The effective literacy rate (i.e. the literacy rate of population excluding children aged 6 and below) is 49.47%.

Demographics (2011 Census)
	Total	Male	Female
Population	1194	618	576
Children aged below 6 years	254	130	124
Scheduled caste	122	71	51
Scheduled tribe	90	52	38
Literates	465	295	170
Workers (all)	418	316	102
Main workers (total)	371	299	72
Main workers: Cultivators	63	58	5
Main workers: Agricultural labourers	175	141	34
Main workers: Household industry workers	16	12	4
Main workers: Other	117	88	29
Marginal workers (total)	47	17	30
Marginal workers: Cultivators	7	3	4
Marginal workers: Agricultural labourers	32	11	21
Marginal workers: Household industry workers	2	0	2
Marginal workers: Others	6	3	3
Non-workers	776	302	474
